Marl is type of calcium carbonate or lime-rich sedimentary rock.

Marl may also refer to:

People
Marl Young (1917–2009), American musician and arranger
Marley Marl (born 1962), a hip hop record producer

Places

Europe
Marl, North Rhine-Westphalia, a city in Germany
Marl Chemical Park, large chemical works in Marl, Germany
Marl-Hamm station, railway station in Marl
Marl Mitte station, railway station in Marl
Marl-Sinsen station, railway station in Marl
Marl, Lower Saxony, a municipality in Germany
Marl (Conwy electoral ward), in North Wales, UK

North America
Marl Creek Provincial Park, British Columbia, Canada
Marl Hill, an historic building in Virginia
Marl Lake, a small lake in Michigan
Marl Mountains, Mojave National Preserve, California

Science
Marl, another name for the western barred bandicoot
Marl Formation, geologic formation in France
Marl prairie, a type of wetland found in the Everglades, Florida
Marl Slate Formation, a geologic formation in England
Multi-agent reinforcement learning (MARL), a sub-field in machine learning

Other uses
Marl Kingdom, a series of video games by Nippon-Ichi
Marl yarn is made from strands of different-colored yarn twisted together
USS Marl (IX-160), a barge of the United States Navy

See also
Marle (disambiguation)